Cameroon competed at the 1996 Summer Olympics in Atlanta, United States.

Results by Event

Athletics

Men

Track and road events

Women 

Track and road events

Boxing

Judo 

Men

Weightlifting

Wrestling 

Freestyle

References
Official Olympic Reports
sports-reference

Nations at the 1996 Summer Olympics
1996
Olympics